George Kell (13 July 1896 – 1985) was an English professional footballer who played as a full back in the Football League for Brentford, Hartlepools United and The Wednesday.

Career statistics

References

1896 births
Footballers from Gateshead
1985 deaths
Association football fullbacks
English footballers
Sheffield Wednesday F.C. players
Brentford F.C. players
Hartlepool United F.C. players
Gainsborough Trinity F.C. players
English Football League players
Midland Football League players